The Orchesterverein der Gesellschaft der Musikfreunde in Wien (Orchestral Association of the Society of Music Lovers) is Vienna's oldest amateur ensemble. It was founded in 1859 as a daughter association of the Gesellschaft der Musikfreunde (Society of Music Lovers). At that time the term amateurs (or dilettanti as they were also called) was not a pejorative one. It simply defined the real music lover as opposed to the professional musician. Many of these amateurs were fairly well trained, and their ensembles, often supported by professionals, gave public performances.

History 
For several decades the Orchestral Association was an integral part of Vienna's music culture. The 20th century brought about far-reaching changes. It was not only the two wars that made it more and more difficult for the association to attract new members. It was above all the technological development in recording music. Tapes, compact discs etc. made music in high quality sound, performed by excellent orchestras, available for everyone. The techniques of playing improved considerably. Learning to play an instrument, making music, especially classical music, at home, in the family, became less interesting for more and more people.

A few examples may show how well-reputed the Orchestral Association was in the past. Johannes Brahms conducted the ensemble and played the piano, Lovro von Matacic also worked as a conductor, whereas the violinist Arnold Rosé, the pianists Jörg Demus and Paul Badura-Skoda werde accompanied by the Orchestral Association. In addition to this it has always been a main concern of the Orchestral Association to offer young artists at the beginning of their careers an opportunity of public performance, e.g. the violinist Henryk Szeryng, the pianists Alfred Brendel, Mitsuko Uchida and Ingolf Wunder.

In 1993 the Orchestral Association had only 14 members und was on the brink of disbanding. Only merging with another amateur ensemble maintained its further existence. Given the opportunity to play in the Great Hall of the Society of Musik Lovers the Orchestral Association has regained good quality and high reputation since then. Since 2004 the Orchesterverein has been cooperating with the Akademische Bläserphilharmonie (Academic Wind Philharmonics), which makes more demanding programmes feasible.

In order to keep up its high standard of performing, the Orchestral Association has decided not to present more than three concert programmes a year.

Sources 
 Wolfgang Schubert: Der Orchesterverein der Gesellschaft der Musikfreunde in Wien. Hamburg 2009 (Studien zur Musikwissenschaft Bd. 18) 
 Manfred Merk: Nach den Sternen greifen. In: Musikfreunde – Zeitschrift der Gesellschaft der Musikfreunde Wien, März 2011

External links 
 Homepage of the Orchestra

Austrian orchestras
Musical groups from Vienna